Tsedendambyn Natsagdorj (20 February 1944 – 3 May 2017) was a Mongolian wrestler. He competed at the 1968 Summer Olympics, the 1972 Summer Olympics and the 1976 Summer Olympics.

References

External links
 

1944 births
2017 deaths
Mongolian male sport wrestlers
Olympic wrestlers of Mongolia
Wrestlers at the 1968 Summer Olympics
Wrestlers at the 1972 Summer Olympics
Wrestlers at the 1976 Summer Olympics
People from Bayankhongor Province
Asian Games bronze medalists for Mongolia
Asian Games medalists in wrestling
Wrestlers at the 1974 Asian Games
Medalists at the 1974 Asian Games
Universiade medalists in wrestling
Universiade gold medalists for Mongolia
Medalists at the 1973 Summer Universiade
21st-century Mongolian people
20th-century Mongolian people